Tsui Ping is one of the 37 constituencies in the Kwun Tong District in Hong Kong. The constituency returns one district councillor to the Kwun Tong District Council, with an election every four years.

Tsui Ping constituency is loosely based on part of the Tsui Ping Estate in Kwun Tong with an estimated population of 18,780.

Councillors represented

Election results

2010s

1990s

1980s

Notes

References

Kwun Tong
Constituencies of Hong Kong
Constituencies of Kwun Tong District Council
1982 establishments in Hong Kong
Constituencies established in 1982
1999 disestablishments in Hong Kong
Constituencies disestablished in 1999
2011 establishments in Hong Kong
Constituencies established in 2011